Tanypteryx is a small genus of dragonflies in the family Petaluridae. The genus contains only two species. One Tanypteryx hageni , the black petaltail, occurs in the Pacific Northwest and the other, Tanypteryx pryeri , is found in Japan.

References

Petaluridae